Mangosteen (Garcinia mangostana), also known as the purple mangosteen, is a tropical evergreen tree with edible fruit native to tropical lands surrounding the Indian Ocean. Its origin is uncertain due to widespread prehistoric cultivation. It grows mainly in Southeast Asia, southwest India and other tropical areas such as Colombia and Puerto Rico, where the tree has been introduced.

The fruit of the mangosteen is sweet and tangy, juicy, somewhat fibrous, with fluid-filled vesicles (like the flesh of citrus fruits), with an inedible, deep reddish-purple colored rind (exocarp) when ripe. In each fruit, the fragrant edible flesh that surrounds each seed is botanically endocarp, i.e., the inner layer of the ovary. The seeds are of similar size and shape to almonds.

Genus Garcinia also contains several less known fruit-bearing species, such as the button mangosteen (G. prainiana) and the charichuelo (G. madruno).

Description

Tree 

A tropical tree, the mangosteen must be grown in consistently warm conditions, as exposure to temperatures below  for prolonged periods will usually kill a mature plant. They are known to recover from brief cold spells rather well, often with damage only to young growth. Experienced horticulturists have grown this species outdoors, and brought them to fruit in extreme south Florida.

Fruit 
The juvenile mangosteen fruit, which does not require fertilisation to form (see agamospermy), first appears as pale green or almost white in the shade of the canopy. As the fruit enlarges over the next two to three months, the exocarp colour deepens to darker green.

The subsurface chemistry of the mangosteen exocarp comprises an array of polyphenols, including xanthones and tannins that assure astringency which discourages infestation by insects, fungi, plant viruses, bacteria and animal predation while the fruit is immature. Colour changes and softening of the exocarp are natural processes of ripening that indicates the fruit can be eaten and the seeds have finished developing.

Once the developing mangosteen fruit has stopped expanding, chlorophyll synthesis slows as the next colour phase begins. Initially streaked with red, the exocarp pigmentation transitions from green to red to dark purple, indicating a final ripening stage. This entire process takes place over a period of ten days as the edible quality of the fruit peaks. Over the days following removal from the tree, the exocarp hardens to an extent depending upon post-harvest handling and ambient storage conditions, especially relative humidity levels.  If the ambient humidity is high, exocarp hardening may take a week or longer when the flesh quality is peaking and excellent for consumption. However, after several additional days of storage, especially if unrefrigerated, the flesh inside the fruit might spoil without any obvious external indications. Using the hardness of the rind as an indicator of freshness for the first two weeks following harvest is therefore unreliable because the rind does not accurately reveal the interior condition of the flesh. If the exocarp is soft and yielding as it is when ripe and fresh from the tree, the fruit is usually good.

The edible endocarp of the mangosteen has the same shape and size as a tangerine  in diameter, but is white. The number of fruit segments corresponds exactly with the number of stigma lobes on the exterior apex; accordingly, a higher number of fleshy segments also corresponds with the fewest seeds. The circle of wedge-shaped segments contains 4–8, rarely 9 segments, the larger ones harbouring the apomictic seeds that are unpalatable unless roasted. As a non-climacteric fruit, a picked mangosteen does not ripen further, so must be consumed shortly after harvest.

Often described as a subtle delicacy, the flesh bears an exceptionally mild aroma, quantitatively having about 1/400th of the chemical constituents of fragrant fruits, explaining its relative mildness. The main volatile components having caramel, grass and butter notes as part of the mangosteen fragrance are hexyl acetate, hexenol and α-copaene.

History 
Mangosteen is a plant native to Southeast Asia. Highly valued for its juicy, delicate texture and slightly sweet and sour flavor, the mangosteen has been cultivated in Malaysia, Borneo, Sumatra, Mainland Southeast Asia, and the Philippines since ancient times. The 15th-century Chinese record Yingya Shenglan described mangosteen as mang-chi-shih (derived from Malay manggis), a native plant of Southeast Asia of white flesh with a delectable sweet and sour taste.

A description of mangosteen was included in the Species Plantarum by Linnaeus in 1753. The mangosteen was introduced into English greenhouses in 1855. Subsequently, its culture was introduced into the Western Hemisphere, where it became established in West Indies islands, especially Jamaica. It was later established on the Americas mainland in Guatemala, Honduras, Panama, and Ecuador. The mangosteen tree generally does not grow well outside the tropics.

In Southeast Asia, mangosteen is commonly known as the "Queen of Fruit", and is frequently paired with durian, the "King of Fruit".  In Chinese food therapy, mangosteen is considered "cooling", making it a good counterbalance to the "heaty" durian.  There is also a legend about Queen Victoria offering a reward of 100 pounds sterling to anyone who could deliver to her the fresh fruit. Although this legend can be traced to a 1930 publication by the fruit explorer David Fairchild, it is not substantiated by any known historical document.

The journalist and gourmet R. W. Apple, Jr. once said of the fruit, "No other fruit, for me, is so thrillingly, intoxicatingly luscious...I'd rather eat one than a hot fudge sundae, which for a big Ohio boy is saying a lot."  Since 2006, private small-volume orders for fruits grown in Puerto Rico were sold to American specialty food stores and gourmet restaurants who serve the flesh segments as a delicacy dessert.

Propagation, cultivation and harvest
Mangosteen is usually propagated by seedlings. Vegetative propagation is difficult and seedlings are more robust and reach fruiting earlier than vegetatively propagated plants.

Mangosteen produces a recalcitrant seed which is not a true seed strictly defined, but rather described as a nucellar asexual embryo. As seed formation involves no sexual fertilization, the seedling is genetically identical to the mother plant. If allowed to dry, a seed dies quickly, but if soaked, seed germination takes between 14 and 21 days when the plant can be kept in a nursery for about 2 years growing in a small pot.

After planting, the field is mulched in order to control weeds. Transplanting takes place in the rainy season because young trees are likely to be damaged by drought. Because young trees need shade, intercropping with banana, plantain, rambutan, durian or coconut leaves is effective. Coconut palms are mainly used in areas with a long dry season, as palms also provide shade for mature mangosteen trees. Another advantage of intercropping in mangosteen cultivation is the suppression of weeds.

The growth of the trees is retarded if the temperature is below . Young seedlings prefer a high level of shade and mature trees are shade-tolerant.

Mangosteen trees have a weak root system and prefer deep, well drained soils with high moisture content, often growing on riverbanks. The mangosteen is not adapted to limestone soils, sandy, alluvial soils or sandy soils with low organic matter content. Mangosteen trees need a well distributed rainfall over the year (<40 mm/month) and a 3–5 week dry season.

Mangosteen trees are sensitive to water availability and application of fertilizer input which is increased with the age of trees, regardless of region. Maturation of mangosteen fruits takes 5–6 months, with harvest occurring when the pericarps are purple.

Breeding
In breeding of perennial mangosteen, selection of rootstock and grafting are significant issues to overcome constraints to production, harvesting or seasonality. Most of the genetic resources for breeding are in germplasm collections, whereas some wild species are cultivated in Malaysia and the Philippines. Conservation methods are chosen because storage of seeds under dried and low temperature conditions has not been successful.

Because of the long duration until the trees yield fruits and the long resulting breeding cycles, mangosteen breeding has not proven attractive for transplanting or research. Breeding objectives that may enhance mangosteen production include:
 Drought tolerance, especially sensitivity to drought in the first 5 years after germination
 Tree architecture to produce a tree with a crown that is regular and pyramid-shaped
 Fruit quality including i) overcoming bitter taste components caused by changes in pulp, pericarp or aril and ii) pericarp cracking resulting from excessive water uptake
 Rootstock for improved adaptation to drought and robust development in early years of growth

Yield
Mangosteen trees may reach fruit-bearing in as little as 6 years, but may require 12 or more years, depending on climate and cultivation methods. The yield of the mangosteen is variable, depending on climate and age of the tree. If the young tree is bearing for the first time, 200–300 fruits may be produced, whereas at maturity, 500 fruits per season are average. At age 30 to 45 years in full maturity, each tree may yield as many as 3,000 fruits, with trees as old as 100 years still producing.

Regional production
Major mangosteen production occurs in Southeast Asia, mainly in Thailand as the country with the most acreage planted, estimated at 4,000 ha in 1965 and 11,000 ha in 2000, giving a total yield of 46,000 tons. Indonesia, Malaysia and the Philippines are other major Asian producers.  Mangosteen production in Colombia and Puerto Rico has been successful.

Diseases and pests

Common diseases and pests

The pathogens that attack mangosteen are common in other tropical trees. The diseases can be divided into foliar, fruit, stem and soil-borne diseases.

Pestalotiopsis leaf blight (Pestalotiopsis flagisettula (only identified in Thailand)) is one of the diseases that infect especially young leaves. Furthermore, the pathogen causes the fruits to rot before and after the harvest. Additional stem canker and dieback are caused by the pathogen. Some of the symptoms of stem canker are branch splitting, gummosis and bark blistering. The main areas where the disease was observed are Thailand, Malaysia and North Queensland.

Another common disease is the thread blight or white thread blight disease (Marasmiellus scandens) whereas the name comes from the mycelia which resembles thread. Leaves, twigs and branches may also be damaged by the disease. The spores spread with the help of wind, raindrops and insects, and thrive in shady, humid and wet conditions.

An important post-harvest disease affecting mangosteen especially in Thailand is called Diplodia fruit rot (Diplodia theobromae) which, as a secondary pathogen, enters the host plant through wounds.

Phellinus noxius living on the roots and trunk bases causes brown root disease, a name derived from the appearance of the mycelium-binding soil particles. The distribution of the fungus happens through contact with infected wood or thick rhizomorphs on tree stumps.

There are a few pests that feed on mangosteen leaves and fruits including leaf eater (Stictoptera sp.), leaf miner (Phyllocnictis citrella) and fruit borer (Curculio sp.). Especially in nurseries, the larval stage of the leaf eater can cause visible damage on young leaves, but can be managed by biological control agents. The larval stage of fruit borer (Curculio sp.) feeds on different parts of fruit before ripening.

Control measures for diseases and pests
Different management options can be applied to control mangosteen diseases.
 Measures to inhibit sun scalding to minimize leaf blight and stem canker.
 Reduction of wounds caused by insects and storm damage to minimize disease incidence.
 Change of the microclimate by tree spacing and pruning.
 Chemicals applied to root collars and tree stumps to control root diseases.
 Fungicides to control fungal pathogens.
 Biological pest control or insecticides to control insects.

Nutritional content
The endocarp  the white part of the fruit having a mild flavor  is edible, but its nutrition content is modest, as all nutrients analyzed are at a low percentage of the Daily Value (see table for canned fruit in syrup, USDA FoodData Central; note that nutrient values for fresh fruit are likely different, but have not been published by a reputable source).

Uses

Culinary
Without fumigation or irradiation (in order to kill the Asian fruit fly), fresh mangosteens were illegal to import into the United States until 2007. Following export from its natural growing regions in Southeast Asia (particularly Thailand), the fresh fruit is available seasonally in some local markets in North America such as those of Chinatowns. Mangosteens are available fresh, canned and frozen in Western countries. The fruit may be served as a dessert or made into jams. In Vietnam, the ripe fruit is also used as a salad ingredient.

Despite efforts described above to grow mangosteen in the Western Hemisphere, nearly the entire supply is imported from Thailand.

Before ripening, the mangosteen shell is fibrous and firm, but becomes soft and easy to pry open when the fruit ripens. To open a mangosteen, the shell can be scored with a knife, pried gently along the score with the thumbs until it cracks, and then pulled apart to reveal the fruit. Alternatively, the mangosteen can be opened without a knife by squeezing the shell from the bottom until it breaks, allowing the shell to be removed and the fruit eaten while intact with the stem. Occasionally, during peeling of ripe fruits, the purple exocarp juice may stain skin or fabric.

Traditional medicine
Various parts of the plant have a history of use in traditional medicine, mostly in Southeast Asia; it may have been used to treat skin infections, wounds, dysentery, urinary tract infections, and gastrointestinal complaints, although there is no high-quality clinical evidence for any of these effects.

Dried fruits are shipped to Singapore to be processed for medical uses which may include dysentery, skin disorders, and various other minor diseases in several countries across Asia. There is no reliable evidence that mangosteen juice, puree, bark or extracts is effective as a treatment for human diseases.

Natural dye

The extract of mangosteen peels is traditionally used in Indonesia as natural dye for coloring of brown, dark brown, purple or red hues applied to tenun ikat and batik textiles.

Other uses
Mangosteen twigs have been used as chew sticks in Ghana, and the wood has been used to make spears and cabinetry in Thailand. The rind of the mangosteen fruit has also been used to tan leather in China.

Phytochemicals
Mangosteen peel contains xanthonoids, such as mangostin, and other phytochemicals. 
Polysaccharide and xanthone compounds are found in the fruit, leaves, and heartwood of the mangosteen. Fully ripe fruit contain xanthones, garthanin, 8-disoxygartanin, and normangostin.

Marketing
Fresh mangosteen is marketed for only a short period of six to ten weeks due to its seasonal nature. It is mainly grown by smallholders and sold at fruit stalls by roadsides. Its irregular, short supply leads to wide price fluctuations throughout its season and over the years.  Additionally, there is no standard product quality assessment or grading system, making international trade of the fruits difficult.  The mangosteen still remains rare in Western markets, though its popularity is increasing, and it is often sold at a high price.

References

External links 
 

Garcinia
Flora of Malesia
Edible fruits
Fruits originating in Asia
Tropical fruit
Crops
Fruit trees
Plant dyes
Plants described in 1753